The Music Publishers Association (MPA) is a non-profit organisation representing music publishers in the United Kingdom since 1881. It "exists to safeguard and promote the interests of music publishers and the writers signed to them; represent these interests to government, the music industry, the media and the public, provide publishers with a forum, a collective voice and a wide range of benefits, services and training courses; promote an understanding of the value of music and the importance of copyright; and provide information and guidance to members of the public". The MPA is a member of the music industry umbrella organisation UK Music.

History
History
The MPA was founded in 1881 as a way to protect and safeguard the interests of sheet music publishers. The founding members were:

 Thomas Patey Chappell & Frank Chappell (Chappell & Co)
 Emile Enoch (Enoch & Sons)
 George Jeffreys (G F Jeffreys)
 Henry Littleton
 W Morley Jr
 C H Purday (J B Cramer & Co)
 Stroud L Cocks (R. Cocks & Co.)
 Barnard Lucas
They were soon joined by Charles Boosey, Edwin Ashdown and George Patey.

By 1887 the MPA had its own offices in Air Street, London. Over the years the offices have been situated in several London locations, most recently moving to British Music House in December 2005.

By 1905 the MPA had grown to 19 members and would continue to expand its membership to the present total of over 270 publishers handling over three thousand subsidiary companies, dealing in most musical genres.

In the fifties the MPA became involved in the introduction of the Ivor Novello Awards in 1956. A few years earlier in 1951 the MPA became a founder member of the British Joint Copyright Council (which would later become the British Copyright Council in 1965).

In 1976 the association acquired ownership of the Mechanical-Copyright Protection Society (MCPS).

The MPA was a founder member of British Music Rights (formed in 1996) together with the British Academy of Composers, Songwriters and Authors (BASCA), the Mechanical-Copyright Protection Society and the Performing Right Society. In 2008 British Music Rights grew into an expanded body called UK Music.

In October 2015 Jane Dyball was named CEO of MPA Group of Companies bringing together the MPA, Mechanical-Copyright Protection Society (MCPS), Independent Music Publishers e-Licensing (IMPEL) and Printed Music Licensing Limited (PMLL) under one umbrella.

In 2018 IMPEL became a standalone entity to focus on its independent members' interests.

Paul Clements (formally Executive Director of Membership, International & Licensing at PRS for Music) succeeded Jane Dyball as CEO on February 1, 2019.

MPA Group

The MPA currently owns and operates two commercial businesses:

 Mechanical-Copyright Protection Society – MCPS is the UK collection society that licenses mechanical (or reproduction) copyrights on behalf of over 26,000 music publisher and composer members.
 Printed Music Licensing Ltd – PMLL represents music publishers to allow UK schools to make copies of printed music.

Conduct

International Music Score Library Project

In April 2011, the MPA issued a DMCA takedown notice against the International Music Score Library Project (IMSLP), a publisher of public domain sheet music. Go Daddy, the domain name registrar for the IMSLP, removed the domain name "imslp.org", leaving it inaccessible. The MPA's argument was similar to that made in 2007 by Universal Edition. In particular, the MPA claimed that Rachmaninoff's 1913 choral symphony The Bells violated US and EU copyright. According to IMSLP, the action is without any merit. Almost 24 hours later, the MPA announced on Twitter that they had asked Go Daddy to reinstate the domain name.

Hargreaves Review 
The Hargreaves Review has made recommendations that include exemptions of copyright such as 'format shifting', where music users would be allowed to copy music from one format to another legally; for example, copying from CD to MP3 – an act that is technically illegal under UK law. The MPA has taken a firm stance against these recommendations. The MPA claims that this could cost publishers up to £40 million a year. An explanation of why the customers of their members should pay an extra £40 million has not been given.

The Hargreaves Review also proposes an exemption for parodied works. This has also been fiercely opposed by the MPA.

Operation Creative

In August 2016 the MPA joined the Police Intellectual Property Crime Unit's Operation Creative initiative in the fight against online music piracy.

Tony Pool Award 
Created in 2018, The Tony Pool Award Award recognises and celebrates the achievements of those who have shown an outstanding contribution to the administrative areas of the music publishing industry.

The Tony Pool Award was created to recognise and applaud all those individuals that work in the “back office” areas of royalties, copyright, business affairs, finance, HR and IT for music publishers. While not in the spotlight, music publishing depends on this backbone to deliver its £505 million contribution to the UK economy.

The award is in memory of the late Tony Pool who died in 2016. Tony spent most of his working life with Boosey & Hawkes, eventually becoming Head of Business Affairs. He was a firm advocate of copyright reform and made a significant contribution to political discussions in the UK and in Europe. He also paved the way for the creation of British Music Rights.

The MPA Richard Toeman Scholarship 

Founded in 2006, The MPA Richard Toeman Scholarship is designed to:

 Support the progress of outstanding individuals working within the music publishing industry.
 Encourage potential or new recruits to the industry to develop their skills via work placement or study.
 Offer tailored support to recipients towards a successful career in the music publishing industry.

The scholarship is in memory of the late Richard Toeman who died suddenly in March 2005 following a successful 40-year career at Josef Weinberger Ltd. Throughout his career, Richard generously gave his time and expertise to the MPA and to the music publishing business as a whole. He was admired and respected by colleagues working across all sectors of the industry. The MPA is proud to pay tribute to his considerable contribution to our work via the Richard Toeman Scholarship.

Events 
From training courses to member socials and the MPA's legendary Christmas Lunch, the MPA hosts a varied range of events for its members and the wider industry.

MPA Induction Course 
The MPA Induction Course is one of the most renowned courses in the industry. Happening four times a year the course sees an expert group of panellists put the spotlight on all areas of music publishing; copyright royalties, sync, societies, legal issues and data.

Since it began, almost everyone in the music publishing industry has attended the induction course at some point and as such, this esteemed course is nearly always oversubscribed. The duration of the course is a day and a half. The MPA Pub Social, which happens four times a year, normally lands on the second day of the course, where attendees are able to network and socialise in an informal environment.

MPA Intermediate Course 
The MPA Intermediate Course is a brand new course and a direct step-up from our Induction Course. The Intermediate course will provide a more in-depth look at the music publishing business and will expand on topics explored on the Induction Course. It will provide more extensive training for people who are at the mid-level stage in their career. It is for people seeking to refine their existing knowledge and gain a more hands-on, practical understanding of the music publishing business.

MPA Specialist Seminar 
MPA Specialist Seminars offer professionals within music publishing and the wider industry the opportunity to gain valuable and in-depth knowledge on specialist topics over the course of a day. Previous topics have included; How to Grow a Publishing Company, Copyright, Digital, Royalties & Tracking, Sub-publishing and Global Licensing & the Changing International Landscape.

The MPA Christmas Lunch 
More than just lunch. The MPA's legendary end-of-year celebration is one of the most eagerly-anticipated and most loved dates in the music industry calendar, and an opportunity for everyone to unwind and celebrate with colleagues and friends.

Fast approaching its 60th year, the event regularly attracts around 900 guests – all of whom enjoy a grand three-course meal, speeches, and live entertainment. To ensure lots of laughs for this momentous occasion we seek out the best comedy entertainment year after years such as Abandoman, Stephen K Amos, Hal Cruttenden, Andi Osho, Jen Brister.

References

External links 

Music organisations based in the United Kingdom
1881 establishments in the United Kingdom
Organizations established in 1881
Cultural organisations based in London